Beyond the Woods is a 2016 Irish horror film, written and directed by Sean Breathnach. and distributed internationally by Left Films It was shot in County Cork, Ireland.

Plot 
Beyond The Woods is a supernatural horror film set in a secluded holiday home on the eve of the opening of a mysterious fiery sinkhole that locals are calling "The Gates of Hell". Marissa and Jason invited their friends to Marissa's father's old house, which is now used as a holiday home. As the weekend progresses some of the friends start acting out of character. A few of them get very amorous. One of them disappears. One gets lost in the woods.

Reception
The genuine production of the film's scenes and characters makes it one of the most unique and compelling films amongst various low-budget horror movies. The production and video style of this horror film is so clever and refined that it has been alluded and compared to the creations of M Night Shyamalan.

Release
Beyond the Woods premiered October 2016 at the Indie Cork Film Festival in Ireland, and won Best Feature (International) at the UVHFF in London. It was released in February 2018 on DVD.

"Beyond the Woods" was also nominated for "Best Thriller" at the National Film Awards UK in 2019

References

2016 horror films
English-language Irish films
Irish horror films
2016 films
2010s English-language films